Di Centa is an Italian surname. Notable people with the surname include:

Giorgio Di Centa (born 1972), Italian cross-country skier
Manuela Di Centa (born 1963), Italian cross-country skier, sister of Giorgio
Martina Di Centa (born 2000), Italian cross-country skier

Italian-language surnames